The following is a list of concept automobiles that carry the name of Italian automaker Lamborghini, listed in chronological order of their presentation.

References